Ulysses Anthony Ricci (1888–1960) was an American sculptor known primarily for his architectural sculpture.  Born in New York City, Ricci was an apprentice at the Perth Amboy Terra Cotta Works in New Jersey from 1902 to 1906.   He studied at Cooper Union Institute and at the Art Students League with James Earle Fraser and George Bridgman.  He opened his own studio in 1914 and was a partner in the firm Ricci & Zari from 1917 to 1941.

Ricci came to the attention of Karl Bitter when Bitter was head of sculpture decoration at the Panama–Pacific International Exposition which opened in 1915, where Ricci was commissioned to execute some of the sculptural decorations.

Architectural sculptor Corrado Parducci apprenticed with Ricci & Zari.

Architectural Sculpture

Harlan Hatcher Graduate Library, Albert Kahn architect, University of Michigan, Ann Arbor, MI, 1920
Bowery Savings Bank Building, York and Sawyer architects, New York, NY, 1922
Wisconsin Hardware Ltd. Mutual Liability Insurance Company (headquarters), Stevens Point, WI, 1922
General Motors Building, Albert Kahn architect, Detroit, MI, 1922
Angell Hall, Albert Kahn architect, University of Michigan, Ann Arbor, MI, 1924
Detroit Free Press Building, Albert Kan architect, Detroit, MI, 1925
Brotherhood of Railway Trainmen Building, Cleveland, OH
New York Telephone Building, Ralph Thomas Walker architect, New York, 1927
Fisher Building, Albert Kahn architect, Detroit, MI, 1929
DAR Constitution Hall, John Russell Pope, architect, Washington, D.C., 1930
Bank of Lansing Building, Kenneth Black architect, Lansing, MI, 1931
Department of Commerce, Louis Ayres, architect, Washington, D.C., 1934
American Institute of Pharmacy, John Russell Pope architect, Washington, D.C.,  1934
National Archives, John Russell Pope architect, Washington, D.C.,  1935
Rundel Memorial Library, Rochester, NY, Gordon & Kaelber architects, Rochester, NY, 1936
bronze doors at Bank of Canada, Marani, Morris & Allen, architects, Ottawa, ON
bronze doors at the Iranian Embassy, Washington D.C., 1960

Bank of Lansing

References

Outdoor Sculpture in Lansing, Fay Hendry, Photography by Balthazar Korab, iota press, Okamos, Michigan 1980 
Architectural Sculpture of America, Einar Einarsson Kvaran, unpublished manuscript

1888 births
1960 deaths
American architectural sculptors
American male sculptors
Cooper Union alumni
Art Students League of New York alumni
Artists from New York City
20th-century American sculptors
20th-century male artists
National Sculpture Society members
Sculptors from New York (state)